"Don't Hide Your Love" is a song released by American singer-actress Cher as the second single released from the album Foxy Lady. The song was written by Neil Sedaka and Howard Greenfield. It hit number 46 on the Billboard Hot 100, and number 19 on the Adult Contemporary chart. Allmusic editor Joe Viglione wrote that this song should have been duet with the songwriter himself, because it would bring him back into the public eye (he was in the midst of reviving his career in the UK at the time and would return to American fame with "Laughter in the Rain" two years later).

Sedaka recorded "Don't Hide Your Love," and the song was covered by Petula Clark on her 1972 LP, Now.

Charts

References

External links
 

1972 singles
Cher songs
Songs written by Neil Sedaka
Song recordings produced by Snuff Garrett
Songs with lyrics by Howard Greenfield
1972 songs
MCA Records singles
Articles containing video clips